The Supercopa de España de Baloncesto 2011 was the 8th edition of this tournament. It was also called Supercopa Endesa for sponsorship reasons.

It was played  on September 30 and October 1 in the Bilbao Arena in Bilbao. Regal FC Barcelona was the defending champion and managed to defend their title.

Participant teams
The draw of the semifinals was on September 13.

Semifinals

Final

References

External links
 Liga ACB website

Supercopa de España de Baloncesto
2011–12 in Spanish basketball cups